Henry Stanley "Harry" Smith (11 October 1908 – 1993) was an English footballer who made 225 appearances in the Football League, playing for Nottingham Forest and Darlington before the Second World War and briefly for Bristol Rovers thereafter. He played at full back, centre half and wing half. He also played non-league football for home-town club Throckley Welfare. He went on to join Bristol Rovers' coaching staff.

References

1908 births
1993 deaths
People from Throckley
Footballers from Tyne and Wear
English footballers
Association football defenders
Nottingham Forest F.C. players
Darlington F.C. players
Bristol Rovers F.C. players
English Football League players
Place of death missing
Throckley Welfare F.C. players